Setipinna, the hairfin anchovies, is a genus of anchovies. These fish derive their name from the long, filamentous extension of the pectoral fins that is found in most species.   It currently contains eight recognized species.

Species
 Setipinna breviceps (Cantor, 1849) (Shorthead hairfin anchovy)
 Setipinna brevifilis (Valenciennes, 1848) (Short-finned hairfin anchovy)
 Setipinna melanochir (Bleeker, 1849) (Dusky Hairfin anchovy)
 Setipinna paxtoni Wongratana, 1987 (Humpback hairfin anchovy)
 Setipinna phasa (F. Hamilton, 1822) (Gangetic hairfin anchovy)
 Setipinna taty (Valenciennes, 1848) (Scaly hairfin anchovy)
 Setipinna tenuifilis (Valenciennes, 1848) (Common hairfin anchovy)
 Setipinna wheeleri Wongratana, 1983 (Burma hairfin anchovy)

References

 

Anchovies
Freshwater fish genera
Taxa named by William John Swainson